Janoliva is a genus of sea snails, marine gastropod mollusks in the family Olividae.

Species
Species within the genus Janoliva include:

 Janoliva amoni (Sterba & Lorenz, 2005)
 Janoliva simplex (Pease, 1868)
 Janoliva simplex (Pease, 1868)

References

Olividae